This is a list of deities and legendary figures found in Etruscan mythology.

The names below were taken mainly from Etruscan "picture bilinguals", which are Etruscan call-outs on art depicting mythological scenes or motifs. Several different media provide names. Variants of the names are given, reflecting differences in language in different localities and times.

Many of the names are Etruscan spellings (and pronunciations) of Greek names. The themes may or may not be entirely Greek. Etruscans frequently added their own themes to Greek myths. The same may be said of native Italic names rendered into Etruscan. Some names are entirely Etruscan, which is often a topic of debate in the international forum of scholarship.

Deities

Deified mortals

Spirits, demons, and other creatures

Places

Mortals

See also
 Etruscan mythology
 List of Etruscan names for Greek heroes
 Interpretatio graeca

Notes

References

 
 
  Translated by Wendy Doniger, Gerald Honigsblum.
 

 
 
  Downloadable Google Books.

Etruscan